Hevel Modi'in Regional Council (Mo'atza Azorit Hevel Modi'in, lit. Modi'in Region Regional Council) is a regional council in central Israel. It was founded in 1950 and covers an area from Petah Tikva to Modi'in.

The council borders
Drom HaSharon Regional Council, El'ad and Rosh HaAyin in the north
Mateh Binyamin Regional Council in the east
Gezer Regional Council and Modi'in-Maccabim-Re'ut in the south
Drom HaSharon, Lod Valley Regional Council, Lod and Ramle in the west.

The head rabbi of the regional council is Rabbi Eliav Meir who is also the head rabbi of Gimzo.

List of settlements
The council covers a kibbutz, 19 moshavim, three community settlements and a youth village.

Kibbutzim
Be'erot Yitzhak

Moshavim

Ahisamakh
Bareket
Beit Arif
Beit Nehemia
Ben Shemen
Bnei Atarot
Ginaton
Gimzo
Givat Koah
Hadid
Kerem Ben Shemen
Kfar Daniel
Kfar Rut
Kfar Truman
Mazor
Nehalim
Rinatia
Shilat
Tirat Yehuda

Community settlements
Lapid
Mevo Modi'im
Nofekh

Youth villages
Ben Shemen Youth Village

External links
Council website 

 
Regional councils in Israel